Vratislav Mazák (22 June 1937 – 9 September 1987) was a Czech biologist who specialized in paleoanthropology, mammalogy and taxonomy. He was also a painter, often illustrating his books about animals and men.

Born at Kutná Hora, he was a professor at the Charles University's Faculty of Science and worked as a zoologist at the Prague National Museum. With Colin Groves, Mazák described, named and classified the early hominin Homo ergaster. He also described the tiger subspecies Panthera tigris corbetti.

He died in Prague.

Major publications

In Czech 
 Naši savci (1970), Our Mammals
 Kostra velryby v Národním muzeu v Praze a krátký pohled do světa kytovců (1976), The skeleton of the whale in the Prague National Museum and a brief look into the world of cetaceans
 Jak vznikl člověk: Sága rodu Homo (1977), The Origin of Man - Saga of the genus Homo; with Zdeněk Burian
 Velké kočky a gepardi (1980), Big cats and cheetahs  
 Jak vznikl člověk: (Sága rodu Homo) (1986), The Origin of Man—Saga of the genus Homo, a revised and enlarged edition; with Zdeněk Burian
 Kytovci (1988), Cetaceans
 Pravěký člověk (1992), Prehistoric Man; with Zdeněk Burian

In German 
 Der Tiger: Panthera tigris Linnaeus, 1758 (1965)
 Die Namen der Pelztiere und ihrer Felle (1974) 
 Der Tiger: Panthera tigris (1979)
 Der Urmensch und seine Vorfahren (1983)

See also 
 Konstantin Satunin

References

External links 
 Biography, photo and bibliography (mostly in Czech)

1937 births
1987 deaths
Czech paleontologists
Czechoslovak zoologists